Coleman is a Canadian rural community in Prince County, Prince Edward Island.

It is located southeast of O'Leary.

External links
 Government of PEI profile

Communities in Prince County, Prince Edward Island